Building consent authorities (BCAs) are officials who enforce New Zealand's regulatory building control system.  The New Zealand Building Act 2004 sets out a registration and accreditation scheme and technical reviews.  The Act creates operational roles for BCAs.

Authorities
The following are the approved building consent authorities listed on the MBIE Register: Note that the register lists 80 BCAs but some of these are former territorial authorities that have been amalgamated into Auckland Council (such as Franklin District Council and North Shore City Council). Building consents on the Chatham Islands are contracted out to Wellington City Council and large dams on the Chatham's to Environment Canterbury.  In addition to the regional and territorial authorities, Housing New Zealand made a decision in 2019 to establish Consentium, a national BCA in Kāinga Ora, that is responsible for building consents for public housing (up to and including four storeys) across New Zealand that Kāinga Ora intends to retain. Consentium achieved Accreditation in November 2020 and Registration in March 2021. 

Ashburton District Council
Auckland Council
Banks Peninsula District Council
Buller District Council
 Carterton District Council
 Central Hawkes Bay District Council
Central Otago District Council
Christchurch City Council
Clutha District Council
Consentium, a division of Kāinga Ora
Dunedin City Council
Environment Canterbury
Environment Waikato
Far North District Council
Gisborne District Council
Gore District Council
Grey District Council
Hamilton City Council
Hastings District Council
Hauraki District Council
Horowhenua District Council
Hurunui District Council
Hutt City Council
Invercargill City Council
Kaikōura District Council
Kaipara District Council
Kapiti Coast District Council
Kawerau District Council
 MacKenzie District Council
 Manawatu District Council
Marlborough District Council
 Masterton District Council
Matamata-Piako District Council
 Napier City Council
Nelson City Council
New Plymouth District Council
 Northland District Council
Opotiki District Council
Otago Regional Council
 Otorohanga District Council
Palmerston North City Council
 Porirua City Council
Queenstown Lakes District Council
Rangitikei District Council
Rotorua District Council
Ruapehu District Council
Selwyn District Council
 South Taranaki District Council
 South Waikato District Council
South Wairarapa District Council
 Southland District Council
Stratford District Council
 Tararua District Council
Tasman District Council
Taupo District Council
Tauranga City Council
Thames-Coromandel District Council
Timaru District Council
Upper Hutt City Council
Waikato District Council
Waikato Regional Council
Waimakariri District Council
Waimate District Council
Waipa District Council
Wairoa District Council
Waitaki District Council
Waitomo District Council
Wellington City Council
Western Bay of Plenty District Council
Westland District Council
Whakatane District Council
Whanganui District Council
Whangarei District Council

References

Local government in New Zealand
Urban planning